On May 31, 2014, in Waukesha, Wisconsin, United States, two 12-year-old girls, Anissa Weier and Morgan Geyser, lured their friend Payton Leutner into a forest and stabbed her 19 times in an attempt to appease the fictional character Slender Man. Leutner crawled to a road where she was found, and recovered after six days in the hospital. Weier and Geyser were found not guilty by mental disease or defect and committed to mental health institutions for sentences of 25 years to life and 40 years to life, respectively. After seven years, Weier was granted early release and will be under supervision until age 37.

Slender Man 

Slender Man is a fictional entity created on the Something Awful online forums for a 2009 Photoshop paranormal image contest. The Slender Man myths were later expanded by a number of other people, who created fan fiction and artistic depictions of the entity.

Slender Man is a tall, thin character, with a featureless white face and head. He is depicted as wearing a black suit, and is sometimes shown with tentacles growing out of his back. According to the Slender Man myths, the entity can cause amnesia, bouts of coughing, and paranoid behavior in individuals. He is often depicted hiding in forests.

Events of the attack 
The stabbing took place in David's Park, a wooded area near Waukesha, Wisconsin, during a game of hide-and-seek on May 31, 2014. The perpetrators, Anissa Weier (born November 10, 2001) and Morgan Geyser (born May 16, 2002), pinned down Payton Isabella Leutner (also known as Bella, a nickname used at the time of the crime) and stabbed her nineteen times in the arms, legs, and torso with a  blade. Two wounds were to major organs; one missed a major artery of her heart by less than a millimeter, and another went through her diaphragm, cutting into her liver and stomach. Weier and Geyser told Leutner to lie down while they would find help, but they did not get any upon leaving. Afterwards, Leutner dragged herself to a nearby road where she was found by a cyclist. The cyclist called 911 when he saw her.

Around five hours later, Weier and Geyser were apprehended near Interstate 94 at Steinhafel's furniture store, after walking . The knife used in the stabbing was in a bag they carried. Their goal was to meet Slenderman at his mansion, called Slender Mansion, in the Nicolet National Forest, roughly a 200 mile hike from their location. During their interviews, Geyser was described as feeling no empathy while Weier was described as feeling guilty for stabbing the victim, but both felt that the attack was needed to appease Slender Man.

Leutner left the hospital seven days after the attack. She returned to school in September 2014.

Geyser's mental state 
While growing up, Geyser experienced many hallucinations such as ghosts, colors melting down walls, and imaginary friends (one named Maggie and another Sev). One hallucination that occurred often was of a man Geyser named "It" whose body was the color of smoke and ink that stood behind her in mirrors or shifted around corners similar to that of Slender Man. 

After the arrest, Geyser’s mother, Angie, stated she became “floridly psychotic.” Correctional officers saw Geyser talking to herself often, pretending to be a cat, and keeping ants as pets. She saw unicorns as well as had continual conversations with Slender Man and other fictional characters such as Severus Snape.

In the fall of 2014, Geyser was moved to the Winnebago Mental Health Institute to determine if she would be competent enough to stand trial. They diagnosed Geyser on October 22, 2014 with early-onset childhood schizophrenia. However, instead of treatment and medication, they focused on explaining the law to Geyser to prepare her for trial. Nearly half a year later, Geyser was found competent enough to stand trial. 

Geyser’s schizophrenia was continually left untreated for nineteen months leading her to remain in a state of psychosis, or out of touch with reality. In December she was sent back to Winnebago and given antipsychotics which later allowed Geyser to feel remorse after clearing her mind. On March 23, 2016, Geyser was sent back to jail with the medication where she rapidly deteriorated. However, after a suicide attempt, Geyser was transferred back to Winnebago.

Court case and negotiations 
Following the investigation, Geyser was charged with attempted first-degree homicide, a Class-A felony, and Weier was charged with attempted second-degree homicide, a Class-B felony. Due to the nature of the offenses, both Weier and Geyser were waived out of juvenile court to be tried as adults.

In 2017, Weier pleaded guilty to being a party to attempted second-degree homicide. A jury then found her "not guilty by mental disease or defect." Geyser accepted a plea offer under which she would not go to trial, and would be evaluated by psychiatrists to determine how long she should be placed in a mental hospital. She later pleaded guilty but was found not guilty by reason of mental disease or defect, and was diagnosed with schizophrenia, from which her father also suffers.

Weier was sentenced to 25 years to life, an indeterminate sentence involving at least three years locked confinement and involuntary treatment in a state psychiatric institute, followed by communal supervision until age 37. 

Geyser was given the maximum sentence, 40 years to life, an indeterminate sentence involving at least three years locked confinement, in addition to involuntary treatment in a state psychiatric institute until complete resolution of symptoms or until age 53, whichever may happen first; followed by continued communal supervision, periodic reevaluations and/or reinstitution, and further treatment as needed, as required by the sentence imposed. While Geyser will periodically have the opportunity to petition for her release from a mental health facility in the future, she will remain under institutional care for the duration of the sentence. During her trial, Geyser had been committed to the Winnebago Mental Health Institute, and was the youngest patient there.

At a court hearing on March 10, 2021, Weier, who was by then 19, submitted a letter to the court stating that she was "sorry and deeply regretful for the agony, pain, and fear I have caused", not just to Leutner, but to "my community as well". Weier stated that, "I hate my actions from May 31, 2014, but through countless hours of therapy, I no longer hate myself for them." On July 1, 2021, Waukesha County Judge Michael Bohren ordered Weier released from the Winnebago Mental Health Institute, gave state officials sixty days to draw up a conditional release plan, and required that Weier be assigned state Department of Health Services case managers to track her progress until she is 37 years old, the length of her commitment.

On September 13, 2021, Weier was released with multiple stipulations to include: 24-hour GPS monitoring requiring her to not leave Waukesha County without permission. Weier will also have her Internet usage monitored, and will not be allowed to use any forms of social media. Weier will also be required to take medication, and will be personally escorted to regular counseling sessions by a case worker. She will also be required to live with her father during her probation.

Geyser's appeal 
In 2020, an appeals court rejected Geyser's petition to be retried as a juvenile. Her attorney, Matthew Pinix, argued that she should have been charged with attempted second-degree intentional homicide rather than first-degree, and argued that Geyser gave statements to investigators before being read her Miranda rights. He has petitioned the Supreme Court of Wisconsin to review the ruling. In early 2021, the Wisconsin Supreme Court declined to hear the appeal.

Aftermath 

In the aftermath of the stabbing, the Creepypasta Wiki was blocked throughout the Waukesha School District. On the Tuesday following the stabbing, Slender Man creator Eric Knudsen said: "I am deeply saddened by the tragedy in Wisconsin and my heart goes out to the families of those affected by this terrible act."

Sloshedtrain, the administrator of the Creepypasta Wiki, said that the stabbing was an isolated incident that did not accurately represent the creepypasta community. He also stated that the Creepypasta Wiki was a literary website, and that they did not condone murder or satanic rituals.

Members of the creepypasta community held a 24-hour live stream on YouTube June 13–14, 2014, to raise money for the stabbing victim. Joe Jozwowski, an administrator on a creepypasta website, said the purpose of the stream was to show that members of the community cared for the victim, and did not condone real-world violence because they enjoyed fiction that contains violence.

On August 12, Governor Scott Walker issued a proclamation declaring Wednesday, August 13, 2014, "Purple Hearts for Healing Day", and encouraged the people of Wisconsin to wear purple on that day to honor the victim of the stabbing. He also praised the "strength and determination" exhibited by Leutner during her recovery. The city of Madison, Wisconsin, held a one-day bratwurst festival to honor Leutner on August 29, several days before the victim returned to school. Hot dogs and bratwurst were sold to raise money towards the victim's medical costs. The event was run by over 250 volunteers, and raised over $70,000 for Leutner.

Debate on the effect of the Internet on children 
The stabbing resulted in extensive debate about the role of the Internet in society and its effect on children. Russell Jack, Waukesha Police Chief, said that the stabbing "should be a wake-up call for all parents", adding that the Internet "is full of information and wonderful sites that teach and entertain", but that it "can also be full of dark and wicked things". John Egelhof, a retired agent of the Federal Bureau of Investigation, argued that the Internet had become a "black hole" with the ability to expose children to a more sinister world. Egelhof suggested that the best way to avoid future incidents was for parents to keep track of their children's online habits, and to educate them on the differences between right and wrong. Shira Chess, an assistant professor of mass media arts at the University of Georgia, stated that creepypasta was no more dangerous than stories about vampires or zombies. She argued that creepypasta websites were beneficial, and that they gave people the opportunity to become better writers.

Media 
A documentary film on the incident called Beware the Slenderman was released by HBO Films in March 2016, and was broadcast on HBO on January 23, 2017.

A season 16 episode of Law & Order: Special Victims Unit, titled "Glasgowman's Wrath", is loosely based on the event.

The Criminal Minds episode "The Tall Man" (Episode 14.05, airdate October 31, 2018) was also inspired by this story.

On October 14, 2018, a movie inspired by the Slender Man stabbing, called Terror in the Woods, aired on Lifetime. The film stars Ella West Jerrier, Sophia Grace McCarthy, Skylar Morgan Jones, Angela Kinsey, Drew Powell, and Carrie Hood. Christina Ricci serves as the executive producer of the film.

On March 31, 2019, another movie inspired by the Slender Man stabbing titled Mercy Black, starring Daniella Pineda, was released on Netflix with no prior announcement. Directed by Owen Egerton and produced primarily by Blumhouse Productions, it tells the story of two girls with pre-schizophrenia who attempt to murder their friend, believing that a spirit named Mercy Black will offer them a gift in return. Later, the protagonist is released from psychiatric care, and has to deal with the realistic and paranormal consequences of her actions.

On October 24, 2019, more than five years after the stabbing, Leutner, then 17, spoke to ABC's 20/20 about her experience for the first time. She spoke of her scars, saying, "I don't think much of them. They will probably go away and fade eventually". She told the interviewers that she met her attackers in fourth grade. When asked what she would say if she ever saw Geyser again, Leutner added that she would "thank" her, because the attack inspired her to pursue a career in medicine.

In September 2021, in the wake of Weier's release, it was revealed that Leutner had moved out of Waukesha County, and currently attends an undisclosed college as a sophomore student.

See also 
 Folie à deux
 Parker–Hulme murder case
 Sasebo slashing
 Slender Man (film)

References

Further reading 

 
 

2014 in Wisconsin
Crimes in Wisconsin
Criminal duos
Mass media-related controversies in the United States
May 2014 crimes in the United States
May 2014 events in the United States
Moral panic
Slender Man
Stabbing attacks in 2014
Stabbing survivors
Waukesha, Wisconsin